Powder Keg: A Blast Into The Wilderness (commonly referred to as Powder Keg) is a steel launched roller coaster located at Silver Dollar City in Branson, Missouri. Manufactured by S&S – Sansei Technologies and installed by Ride Entertainment Group, the ride opened to the public in 2005. Powder Keg is the longest ride at Silver Dollar City behind the Frisco Silver Dollar Line.

To save on construction costs, elements of the former Buzzsaw Falls Water Coaster, which was manufactured by Premier Rides and was replaced by Powder Keg, were used for the new ride; namely the lift hill structure.  Other tributes to the former ride can be found in the thematic elements surrounding the queue line, such as an old Buzzsaw Falls car stuck in the roof of the first queue building, and a piece of old Buzzsaw track sticking out of the queue building's roof.

History

Buzzsaw Falls (1999–2003)
On September 25, 1998, Silver Dollar City announced that they would be building their next roller coaster. It would be scheduled to open in 1999, six years after Thunderation. The park hired Premier Rides to design a one-of-a-kind prototype model known as a Liquid Coaster. This new water coaster model would feature a log flume portion and a roller coaster portion. It would sit in a  plot of land surrounded by trees and hilly terrain. While the ride was set to be named Ripsaw Falls, the name was changed to Buzzsaw Falls. The ride would cost $7 million to build.

The attraction was going to open on May 16, 1999, but the opening was delayed due to mechanical flaws. Buzzsaw Falls would officially open to the general public on July 3, 1999. 

Buzzsaw Falls operated sporadically due to several maintenance issues. Each ride vehicle featured plastic shields on both sides to prevent flooding. They were movable and wouldn't allow guests to enter or exit the vehicle. The ride featured infrared sensors, which became extremely sensitive to interference. In addition, Buzzsaw Falls could not run without water, and had to be pumped constantly. This ongoing issue led to high operational costs.

Powder Keg: A Blast Into The Wilderness (2005–present)
In 2003, Buzzsaw Falls was closed to undergo a major refurbishment. S&S Worldwide would convert the water coaster into a launched coaster. The remodel would feature a new track and compressed air launch, while keeping the original track and chain lift hill from Buzzsaw Falls.

On November 6, 2004, it was announced that the new ride would be named Powder Keg: A Blast Into The Wilderness. In March 2005, the ride completed its first test runs. At a cost of $10 million, Powder Keg would open on April 8, 2005.

Rider experience

After being launched out onto the track, riders go up a relatively small hill and down a very steep drop. Riders go up and down hills many times and go through several tight turns before slowly traveling up a chainlift hill equipped with audio speakers playing bluegrass music. The train goes through a 90-degree left turn before going down another steep drop onto a small spray-painted blue section of the track. At the final end of the ride, the train travels through a large helix that almost turns the track completely upside down before the train slams into the final brakes and turns into the station.

References

External links

Roller coasters in Missouri
Roller coasters introduced in 2005
Buildings and structures in Taney County, Missouri
Silver Dollar City
Roller coasters operated by Herschend Family Entertainment
Western (genre) amusement rides
2005 establishments in Missouri